Euphaedra thalie is a butterfly in the family Nymphalidae. It is found from the Uele in the Democratic Republic of the Congo.

Similar species
Other members of the Euphaedra zaddachii species group q.v.

References

Butterflies described in 1981
thalie
Endemic fauna of the Democratic Republic of the Congo
Butterflies of Africa